List of educational organizations in Perumbavoor, Ernakulam district, Kerala, India.

Colleges
KMP College of Engineering, Odakkali
ENLIGHT College Perumbavoor
KMP College of Arts & Science, Perumbavoor
M.E.S. College, Marampally
National College, Vengola 
Jai Bharath College, Arackappady
Adi Shankara Institute of Engineering Technology
ILM College of Engineering, Methala
ILM College of Arts & Science, Methala
Sree Narayana Gurukulam College of Engineering
Marthoma College of Management & Technology
Mar Thoma College, Perumbavoor
SSV College
CET College of Management, Science and Technology
Sree Sankara College
Govt. Polytechnic
St. Mary's College of Commerce and Management Studies, Thuruthipilly
Indra Gandhi college of Arts & science, Nellikuzhi
Rajagiri Viswajyothi College, Vengoor
S.N Training College, Okkal

Higher Secondary Schools
Jama-ath Higher Secondary school, Thandekkad
Nusrathul Islamic V.H.S.S, Marampally
Govt. H.S.S., Mudickal
Asram Higher Secondary School
Govt Boys Higher Secondary School
Govt Girls Higher Secondary School
Govt. H.S.S. Kallil, Methala
Mgm school, KkuruppumPadi
JAYAKERALAM HSS PULLUVAZHY
MGM Higher Secondary School,Kuruppampady

High schools
Queen Mary's English Medium High School, Mudickal
Al-Azhar English Medium High school, Ponjassery
Hidayathul Islam High school, Kandanthara
Amrita Vidyalayam, Kaduval
St. Mary's Public School, Thuruthiply
Jamiya Hassaniyeh High school, Vazhakulam
M.E.T. Public School, Poopani
St. Thomas public school, Iringole

Education in Ernakulam district